Andre Antonio Samuels (December 30, 1954 – September 12, 2001) was an American football tight end who played four seasons in the National Football League with the Kansas City Chiefs and Tampa Bay Buccaneers. He was drafted by the Kansas City Chiefs in the fourth round of the 1977 NFL Draft. He first enrolled at Florida A&M University before transferring to Bethune-Cookman University. Samuels attended Northeast High School in St. Petersburg, Florida. He was also a member of the Washington Federals of the United States Football League.

References

External links
Just Sports Stats

1954 births
2001 deaths
Players of American football from Tampa, Florida
American football tight ends
African-American players of American football
Florida A&M Rattlers football players
Bethune–Cookman Wildcats football players
Kansas City Chiefs players
Tampa Bay Buccaneers players
Washington Federals/Orlando Renegades players
20th-century African-American sportspeople